Universidad Católica del Ecuador is a football club based in Quito, Ecuador. They play in the top tier of Ecuadorian football and have spent the majority of their history in the top-flight Serie A.

Universidad Católica was officially founded on 15 May 1963. Historic rivals include LDU Quito, Aucas, El Nacional and Deportivo Quito.

History
Universidad Católica was founded as a university football team for Pontificia Universidad Católica del Ecuador, a Catholic university in Quito. In 1962, they won the inter-university championship. Soon after, they became a football club on 15 May 1963 under Liga Deportiva de la Universidad Católica.

On 15 January 1965, they beat Club Gladiador for the right to compete professional. They then won their first professional title at the 12th Interandean Professional Championship that same year.

In 1973 and 1979, Universidad Católica finished second in the national championship. As a results, they were allowed to participate in the Copa Libertadores the following years (1974 and 1980). Although being in the First Category (Primera A & Primera B) for most of their history, they descended to the Second Category in 1993. They returned to Primera B in 1998, and ascended briefly to Primera A for 2008.

Honors 
Regional
Campeonato Professional Interandino (1): 1965
National
Serie A
Runner-up (2): 1973, 1979
Serie B
Winner (3): 1990 E1, 2007, 2012
Runner-up (6): 1972 E2, 1989 E1, 2005 C, 2006 E1, 2006 E2, 2009

Current squad
As of 5 March 2022.

Managers
 Jorge Célico (September 21, 2010 - August 5, 2014)
 Luis Soler (August 5, 2014 - October 5, 2014)
 Jorge Célico (5 October 2014 - July 17, 2017)
 Patricio Lara (July 17, 2017 - July 24, 2017)
 Gustavo Díaz (July 25, 2017 - August 26, 2017)
 Marcelo Romano (August 27, 2017 - November 4, 2017)
 Santiago Escobar (November 4, 2017 - October 25, 2021)
 Miguel Rondelli (October 26, 2021-

Kit and colours
They wear sky blue on their home kit and white on their away kit. Their kit is supplied by Umbro.

References

External links

Official website 

Football clubs in Ecuador
Football clubs in Quito
1963 establishments in Ecuador
University and college association football clubs